Ángel Bernabé Acosta (born 11 August 1987) is a Spanish footballer who plays as a goalkeeper for CP Cacereño.

Club career
Born in Velada, Province of Toledo, Bernabé played for some local clubs before joining Atlético Madrid at the age of 18 and going through its various youth levels. In the 2008–09 season he was promoted to the first team due for preseason in Mexico, but spent the campaign mainly registered with the B-side while having third-choice duties with the main squad, behind established Leo Franco and Grégory Coupet.

In June 2009, Bernabé was released by the Colchoneros, joining second division's UD Salamanca. He played in only seven league games in his first two years combined, with the second ending in relegation; his debut as a professional occurred on 2 September 2009 in a 1–1 home draw against CD Castellón for the Copa del Rey, and he first appeared in the league 18 days later, in a 0–1 home loss to UD Las Palmas.

International career
Bernabé was part of the Spain under-19 team for the 2006 UEFA European Championship, where the nation emerged victorious. The following year, again as backup, he was selected for the 2007 FIFA U-20 World Cup.

Honours
Spain U19
UEFA European Under-19 Championship: 2006

References

External links

1987 births
Living people
Sportspeople from the Province of Toledo
Spanish footballers
Footballers from Castilla–La Mancha
Association football goalkeepers
Segunda División players
Segunda División B players
Tercera División players
Atlético Madrid C players
Atlético Madrid B players
Atlético Madrid footballers
UD Salamanca players
Cádiz CF players
Atlético Sanluqueño CF players
UB Conquense footballers
CF Talavera de la Reina players
Marbella FC players
CP Cacereño players
Spain youth international footballers